Hathorn Davey was a British manufacturer of steam engines, based in Leeds. The Sun foundry was established in 1846 and made railway engines and pumping machinery until 1870. The premises were taken over in 1872 by Hugh Campbel, Alfred Davis and John Hathorn. They were joined by Henry Davey in 1873 and traded as Hathorn, Davey & Co from 1880.  The partnership was converted to a limited company in 1901.  They made marine engines and pumps as well as their pumping engines for mines and waterworks. The pumping engine built for the Mersey tunnel in 1881 was described at the time as the most powerful in existence.  The firm was taken over by Sulzers in 1936. The premises closed in late 1981 when Sulzers moved to a new site.

The horizontal compound differential pumping engine

This was one of their more successful engines. Patented in 1871, a company brochure lists 46 examples of these large engines built up to 1906. The leaflet also gives 32 examples where a smaller version of this engine was installed underground. The differential was a small engine resembling a boiler feed pump which was used to control the speed of the larger engine.

Davey pumps were also installed in Japan, for example at Manda coal mine in 1876. The nearby Onga River Pumping Station of Yawata Steel Works also received a steam pump from Davey.

The largest concentration of this design was at the Tasmania Gold Mining Co's Beaconsfield mine where three engines were assembled. Beaconsfield mine closed in 1914 when the pumps were overwhelmed and re-opened in 1999. At least 7 of these engines were used in the Furness iron mines, 3 at Yarlside and the remainder at Harrison Ainslie's pits. There is a surviving example at Cambridge Museum of Technology.

References

External links 

 London Museum of Water and Steam
 Grace's Guide
 Hunslet remembered.
 Melbourne museum
 Cambridge Museum of Technology
 Visit of Institute of Mining Engineers to Lowfield and Bercune
 Detailed account of Stank and Yarlside pumps in 1899 by Jas Davison for the IME.
 Inside of Violet pit engine house showing the differential engine.
 Sun foundry

Steam engine manufacturers
Manufacturing companies based in Leeds
Defunct companies based in Leeds
Defunct engineering companies of England